Jeunesse Sportive du Chemin Bas d'Avignon, also known as Nîmes Chemin Bas, is a football club based in Nîmes, France. Founded in 1962, the club competes in the Régional 2, the seventh tier of French football, as of the 2021–22 season. The club's colours are blue and black.

Chemin Bas d'Avignon reached the round of 64 of the Coupe de France for the first time in the club's history in the 2021–22 edition of the tournament.

Notable former players 

  Sofiane Alakouch

References 

Sport in Nîmes
Association football clubs established in 1962
1962 establishments in France
Football clubs in Occitania (administrative region)